David Daly (born ) is an Irish male weightlifter, competing in the 105 kg category and representing Ireland at international competitions. He competed at world championships, most recently at the 1999 World Weightlifting Championships.

Major results

References

1973 births
Living people
Irish male weightlifters
Place of birth missing (living people)